The Russian Gold Basket Awards were the annual basketball awards that were given out by the Russian Basketball Federation (RBF), from 2004, to 2009.

Russian Gold Basket winners

See also
Russian Professional League Awards
Russian Super League A
Russian Women's Super League A
Russian national basketball team
Russian women's national basketball team

External links
Russian Basketball Federation Official Website 
Russian Basketball Federation Federal Book 

Basketball in Russia
Awards
European basketball awards